Laminar Flow is the 21st album by Roy Orbison recorded at Wishbone Recording Studio in Muscle Shoals, Alabama and released in 1979 on the Asylum Records label. It was the last album of new material Orbison would release in his lifetime. His next studio effort, In Dreams, featured re-recordings of old Orbison hits while Mystery Girl and King of Hearts, his final collections of all-new material, were released posthumously.

Track listing
Side One
 "Easy Way Out"  –  (Jim Valentini, Frank Saulino, Spady Brannan)
 "Love Is a Cold Wind"  –  (Charlie Black, Rory Bourke)
 "Lay It Down"  –  (Robert Byrne, Tommy Brasfield)
 "I Care"  –  (Lenny LeBlanc, Eddie Struzick)
 "We're Into Something Good"  –  (George Soulé, Terry Woodford)
 "Movin'"  –  (Roy Orbison, Chris Price)

Side Two
 "Poor Baby"  –  (Roy Orbison, Chris Price, Regi Price)
 "Warm Spot Hot"  –  (Eddie Struzick)
 "Tears"  –  (Roy Orbison, Chris Price, Dan Price, Regi Price)
 "Friday Night"  –  (Regi Price, Chris Price)
 "Hound Dog Man"  –  (Barbara Orbison, Terry Woodford, Tommy Stuart)

Personnel
Roy Orbison – vocals
Larry Byrom, Mac McAnally – acoustic guitar
Bill Hinds, Robert Byrne, Tippy Armstrong – guitar
Lenny LeBlanc – drums, acoustic guitar, backing vocals
Bob Wray, Lonnie Ledford – bass guitar
Clayton Ivey – keyboards
Roger Clark – drums, synthesizer
Mickey Buckins, Tom Roady – percussion
Jim Horn – tenor saxophone, baritone saxophone 
Harvey Thompson – tenor saxophone
Ronald Eades – baritone saxophone
Harrison Calloway – trumpet
Charles Rose – trombone
Barbara Wyrick, Chris Price, Eddie Struzick, Marie Tomlinson, Robert Byrne, Suzy Storm, Terry Woodford – backing vocals

References

1979 albums
Roy Orbison albums
Asylum Records albums